Simon Humphrey Gaspard Martin-Brisac (born 20 November 1992) is a field hockey player from France.

Career

Under–21
Simon Martin-Brisac debuted for the France U–21 team in 2012 at the EuroHockey Junior Championship in 's-Hertogenbosch.

The following year he went on to represent the team at the FIH Junior World Cup in New Delhi. At the tournament he won a silver medal, a history making performance for the French team.

Senior national team
Martin-Brisac made his debut for the French national team in 2012.

Since his debut, Martin-Brisac has been a regular fixture in the national squad. He won his first major medal with the senior team in 2019 at the FIH Series Finals in Le Touquet, taking home a gold medal.

References

External links

1992 births
Living people
French male field hockey players
Male field hockey forwards
2023 Men's FIH Hockey World Cup players